MSK may refer to the following:
 Marinestosstruppkompanie, German naval assault troops
 Marske railway station, England, National Rail station code
 Medullary sponge kidney
 Medvedev–Sponheuer–Karnik scale, a macroseismic intensity scale
 Memorial Sloan Kettering Cancer Center
 Minimum-shift keying radio modulation
 Mohammad Sidique Khan, a perpetrator of the July 2005 London bombings
 Moscow
 Moscow Time
 Common abbreviation for Human musculoskeletal system
 Museum of Fine Arts, Ghent (Museum voor Schone Kunsten), Belgium
 Premier Sports, UK TV channel, formerly  MSK
 MSK (professional wrestling), a professional wrestling tag team